Alex Campbell (27 April 1931 – 3 January 1987) was a Scottish folk singer. He was influential in the British folk music revival of the 1950s and 1960s and was one of the first folk singers (in modern times) to tour the UK and Europe. His nickname was "Big Daddy," and he was known for his charisma, story-telling, and singing. He was described by Colin Harper as a "melancholic, hard-travelling Glaswegian."

Biography

Campbell was born in Glasgow to a family who originated from the Hebrides. Both of his parents and his two sisters died from tuberculosis in the same year; Campbell spent some time in an orphanage before being taken in by his grandmother. During World War II he met American, Polish and Australian servicemen who were based in Glasgow and he developed an interest in the songs they sang.

On leaving school, he worked for the Civil Service and had a successful career until an occasion when he lost his temper and had to leave. With the savings from his employment, he enrolled for a course at the Sorbonne, in Paris (apparently on a whim). However, he quickly ran out of money and began busking in the streets to support himself, playing the guitar and singing Lead Belly songs and Scottish folk songs. Some sources claim that he pretended to be a blind blues singer: a white stick enhanced the disguise.

He met the American folk musician Derroll Adams who found him a regular engagement, playing in a café, but Campbell also continued busking the streets. He made regular return trips to Britain in the 1950s, appearing at Alexis Korner's Blues and Barrelhouse Club and other skiffle and folk music venues that were opening around the country. Back in Paris, a new generation of folk musicians, such as Davey Graham and Wizz Jones followed in his footsteps.

Campbell became involved in the folk music revival taking place in London and met Ewan MacColl, who was an influential figure in the folk movement. However, the two men disagreed on their approaches to folk music, with MacColl taking a very purist view that people should only sing music from their own regional background, whereas Campbell had an eclectic repertoire and sang whatever he liked, whether it was a Scottish Ballad, an English folksong or an American work song. A contemporary article in The Observer attempted to characterise the folk community into two camps: the "MacCollites" and the "Campbellites".

MacColl (then married to Jean Newlove) had fallen in love with Peggy Seeger. In 1958, when Seeger's UK work permit expired, Alex Campbell agreed to a marriage of convenience with her. On 24 January 1959, he married her in Paris. Seeger's USA passport had been withdrawn, and this marriage prevented deportation, and was, according to Seeger "a platonic relationship". Seeger has described the wedding ceremony as "hilarious": at the time she was seven months pregnant with Ewan MacColl's baby and the officiating priest lectured Campbell about his forthcoming lifetime commitment to "the poor girl whom he had got into so much trouble". The following day, Seeger returned to London and settled down with MacColl. 

Campbell himself settled down with his eventual wife, Patsy, and had two sons. By 1961, Campbell was playing folk clubs in London, including Les Cousins, and appeared several times, on and off stage, at Robin Hall and Jimmie Macgregor's London Folk Song Cellar on the BBC. He toured Germany several times, and other parts of Europe. For several years he lived in Denmark, first in Skagen, and later in Tonder.

Last years and death
By the early 1980s he was diagnosed with throat cancer, and struggled to speak. He died of tuberculosis in Denmark on 3 January 1987.

In 1986, Rab Noakes wrote the song, "Gently Does It", as a tribute to Campbell, contrasting the powerful presence Campbell had with the realities of his illness, and expressing a wish for him to slow down. The song includes the line "And a few years ago you'd been on this road so long", referencing Campbell's best known song.

The singer-songwriter Allan Taylor wrote, "Alex Campbell was the most important and influential folksinger of the folksong revival in Europe, admired, respected and loved by his fellow performers and his audiences. An outrageous, hard drinking, hard travelling, hard living man."

In his autobiography, the comedian Billy Connolly wrote of his admiration for Campbell. In addition, Campbell himself would often tell stories about himself that were self-deprecating and humorous. One such story, from Ian MacKintosh concerns Alex and his friend Hamish Imlach.

Once he and Hamish Imlach were heading for a gig, and stopped for a drink. In the lounge bar, the barmaid said 'Yes, gentlemen.' Alex said 'Gentlemen? Before you is the cream of Scottish folk music – Alex Campbell and Hamish Imlach. We'll have two pints of your best and twenty Benson & Hedges.' The barmaid went through to the saloon bar for the cigarettes, came back and said 'What was the name again?' Alex said "Alex Campbell.' The barmaid said 'No, no, what cigarettes?'"

Recording career

Campbell is reputed to have recorded over 100 records, but was never commercially successful. Perhaps as a result of his troubadour lifestyle as well as his preference for expressing songs as opposed to being "technically perfect" as a folksinger, Campbell believed in recording quickly, in the style of most early American Bluesmen, and more famously, Bob Dylan. However, Alex's love for a wide range of music, coupled with his generosity towards young, unknown talent, invariably resulted in albums which were diverse in nature and rich in instrumentation. Backing musicians include Martin Carthy (Transatlantic recordings) Gerry Loughran – usually spelled "Lockran", Royd Rivers, Dave Laibman and Ian McCann.

Campbell's early recordings include quite a large share of American folk songs. Later his repertoire usually included Scots dialect songs, big ballads and erotic songs. He also sang Woody Guthrie, Bob Dylan, and Tom Paxton songs and accompanied himself on guitar.

His 1967 album, Alex Campbell and His Friends, contains three songs with Sandy Denny taking the lead. They are the earliest available professional recordings by Denny.

In 1976, Campbell made an album of Scots songs with Alan Roberts and Dougie MacLean. In the same year, the album entitled Big Daddy of Folk Music was recorded with the Tannahill Weavers. Two albums featuring Phil Beer and Paul Downes entitled No Regrets and Traditional Ballads of Scotland were subsequently released.

His album, Det er godt at se dig (It's good to see you), was recorded in Denmark and featured a variety of Danish musicians including Niels Hausgaard. Additionally, the album's title track was written by Allan Taylor. The song became a firm favourite in Denmark and Germany and became synonymous with Alex Campbell. Recorded in 1979, it is at least the fourth album recorded in Denmark with Danish musicians. Almost 15 years earlier, Alex had recorded In Copenhagen" for the Storyville label which was followed by At The Tivoli Gardens which showcases the works of other writers including Anne Briggs, Bob Dylan, Tom Paxton, and Paul Simon.

Campbell's legacy to the world of traditional music lies in his art as a performing artist where he would captivate and enthrall with a strong charismatic presence. In addition, his albums contained a production and musicality which was often not present in most traditional albums of the day, and these studio albums stand out as major examples of his ability to arrange and work with groups of skilled musicians.

In 1997, Allan Taylor issued the double-album, The Alex Campbell Tribute Concert, which was recorded at the Skagen Festival in Denmark on 2 July 1995.

One can still purchase a few re-released albums by Campbell. Although the sample that remains is tiny compared to his output, they are a significant contribution to British traditional music.

Select album discography
1958: Chansons populaires des États-Unis
1963: The Best Loved Songs of Bonnie Scotland
1963: Way Out West
1963: An Alex Campbell Folk Session
1964: Alex Campbell
1965: Alex Campbell, Colin Wilkie and Shirley Hart Sing Folk
1965: Alex Campbell in Copenhagen
1966: Yours Aye – Alex
1967: Alex Campbell at the Tivoli Gardens
1967: Alex Campbell and His Friends
1968: Alex Campbell Live
1968: The Scottish Breakaway
1969: Alex Campbell Sampler
1971: This is Alex Campbell, Vol. 1
1971: This is Alex Campbell, Vol. 2
1972: Alex Campbell at His Best
1972: Life is Just That Way
1975: Goodbye Booze
1976: Big Daddy of Folk Music
1976: No Regrets
1977: Traditional Ballads of Scotland
1979: Det er godt at se dig
1979: Live and Studio
1979: C-R-M (Alex Campbell-Alan Roberts-Dougie MacLean)
1981: Live in Belgium
1987: Alex Campbell – With the Greatest Respect
2005: Been On The Road So Long (The Alex Campbell Anthology)

References

External links
FolkWorld Article: Alex Campbell
BEEN ON THE ROAD SO LONG
Alex Campbell folksinger

1931 births
1987 deaths
University of Paris alumni
Scottish folk singers
Scottish folk musicians
20th-century Scottish male singers
20th-century Scottish musicians
Transatlantic Records artists
British expatriates in France